Whitson is a village on the outskirts of the city of Newport, South Wales. Administratively, Whitson is part of the community of Goldcliff.

Origin of the name 
Sir Joseph Bradney, in his History of Monmouthshire(1922), is undecided on the derivation of the name of the manor and surrounding village, but notes early spellings such as Witston, Widson and Wyttston. It seems most likely, however, that the name came from "Whitestone", similar to the adjacent "Goldcliff". In 1358 the manor was held "...by John de Saint Maur of Penhow of Peter de Cusance by knight service, as of his manor of Langstone". In the 18th and 19th centuries the Phillips family owned a large estate in the parish and lived at what was then called "Whitson House" (now "Whitson Court").

Character 
Together with the neighbouring larger parishes of Nash and Goldcliff it is one of the so-called "Three Parishes" which have long been treated as a unit – geographically, socially, economically and ecclesiastically.

At high-tide much of the land in the village is below sea-level. A main drainage ditch, with an origin near Llanwern, known as "Monksditch" or "Goldcliff Pill" passes through the village on its way to the sea. Local folklore maintains that the sides of the Monksditch are laced with smuggler's brandy.

The main part of the village has the houses and farmsteads set back from the road in long strips of pasture reflecting a medieval 'cope' land allocation pattern, similar to that used in land reclamation in Holland.

The real outpost of the village is the remote Porton House, situated next to the sea and accessed from Great Porton. Historically Porton has been part of Goldcliff and may have once had its own separate church, although confusion with Whitson church seems more likely. For many years Porton, like Goldcliff, was the site of a salmon fishery.

History 

Kelly's Directory of 1901 lists the Parish Clerk as one William Roberts and sub-postmaster as one Richard Keyte. Two private dwellings are listed for a Mr. St. John Knox Richards Phillips J.P. at Whitson Court and for Reverend John Price of St.Bees (vicar of Whitson & Goldcliff) at the Vicarage.

Commercial residents are listed as:
Henry Gale, farmer, Church Farm;
John Hale, farmer, Whitson Farm;
Mrs Charlotte Howells, farmer, Whitson Green;
Thomas James, Newhouse;
Edward Jones, stonemason;
Robert Roberts, farmer;
John Keyte, farmer, Chestnut Tree Farm;
Richard Keyte, carpenter, wheelwright & post office;
Edgar Morgan, farmer, Court Farm;
John Waters, farmer, Green Court;
Charles Webb, farmer.

Eve, daughter of one time postmaster Mr Roberts, is alleged to have died at The Farmer's Arms in Goldcliff and caused a haunting of the property. When a religious ceremony of exorcism was performed, Eve's ghost appeared and was chased northwards by the villagers, towards the town, where she flung herself into a well. The well became known as "Ffynnon Eva" or Eve's Well – in the Newport district in Beechwood now known as Eveswell.

Architecture

The Church

The tiny parish church, with its distinctive "thimble tower," is situated to the east of the village at Porton. It is a Grade II* listed building and is thought to have originally been a chapellage of the Benedictine Priory at Goldcliff. Although the original dedication is unclear, the church is known locally as St. Mary's (not to be confused with the church of St. Mary Magdelene at Goldcliff).

An ancient building of stone, in the Early English style, it consists of chancel, nave, south porch and a western tower, originally containing two bells. The inscription for the larger bell was "God save our King and Kingdom, and send us peace. W. and E. 1758" and for the smaller bell of the same date "Obedite".

Prior to the 20th century the nave was restored and the chancel substantially rebuilt. There is a Norman font and a stained glass memorial east window erected in 1884 by the family of Reverend John Beynon. In 1901 there were 100 sittings. The register of baptisms dates from  1744, marriages from 1729 and burials from 1728. In 1901 the living was a vicarage with a net income of £196, including  of glebe and residence, in the gift of Eton College and the Dean and Chapter of Llandaff alternately, and held from 1900 by the Reverend John Price.

Bradney (1933) notes the church as "remarkable for its fine tower with a pinnacle at one corner." The church is now closed, is in a very poor state of repair, and has been placed on the council's register for Buildings at Risk. The churchyard, which is well maintained, may still be accessed by means of a public footpath through private land. In November 2018 it was stated that plans to convert the church to a private residence were likely to be rejected because of flood risk. Concerns were also raised over a stained glass window, dedicated to the memory of Herbert and Alice Stevens, paid for by their 14 children.

In 2021, planning permission to convert the church into residential accommodation was granted by Newport City Council.

Whitson Court

Whitson Court is a neo-classical house. Built in the grounds of a medieval tithe barn linked to Goldcliff Priory and on the site of an earlier house, the present property was built for William Phillips (1752–1836), High Sheriff for Monmouthshire, in about 1791 and is a Grade II* listed building, retaining many original features.

Originally believed to have been designed by Anthony Keck, who had designed a similar property at Iscoed in Carmarthenshire, Whitson House had many Nash-inspired additions including the unsupported cantilever stone spiral staircase in the hall, similar to that of Ffynone House at Manordeifi in Pembrokeshire, with an arched door frame underneath and plasterwork known to have been used at other Nash houses. There were also false plaster windows added to the ends of the adjoining pavilions which were typical of John Nash. In the same year (1791), Nash was working on his design for Newport Bridge and the lodge at Whitson Court is of a typical Nash design.

Monumental inscriptions at Whitson Church indicate that the house was called Whitson House from at least 1789 and for most of the 19th century, but had become Whitson Court by 1903. Memorial stones for the Phillips family may also be found in St. Mary's church in the neighbouring village of Nash. (William Phillips also built Redbrick House in nearby Redwick).

After the death of St. John Knox Rickards Phillips, in 1901 ownership of the house passed to a distant relative, Fr Oliver Rodie Vassall-Phillips CSsR. In consequence of the persecution of religious congregations in France, the Sacramentines of Bernay of the Perpetual Adorers of the Blessed Sacrament at the time of the expulsion in July 1903, were compelled to close their boarding-school and go into exile. Thirteen of the sisters retired to Belgium, and founded a house at Hal, while the rest of their community settled at Whitson Court  – thanks to the generosity of Reverend Vassall-Phillips, who wrote:

"This order of nuns existence is precarious, for they are not permitted to open a school. Their days are spent in prayer, adoration, and the making of altar-breads, vestments, and church ornaments." In 1910 the left pavilion wing, which was used as the estate laundry, was partially destroyed by fire.

In March 1911, the Sacramentines were permitted by Archbishop Farley to open a house in Holy Trinity parish, Yonkers, New York and the house and estate at Whitson were then used as a training school for their African missions. When Bradney published his "History of Monmouthshire" in 1932, the house stood empty.

In 1933 Whitson Court and its remaining  of gardens and parkland, were purchased from the then owner, Squire Oakley, by Mr Garroway Smith of "The Chalet" at Ridgeway in Newport who took up residence at the property with his wife Mary and his sister Louise. Mr William Maybury, his wife Olive Maybury and their daughters, Jane and Elizabeth also moved into the house. Their third daughter, Mary, was born at Whitson Court in May 1938.

During World War II, the family gave sanctuary to several German Jewish refugees as well as providing work for German Prisoners of War – many of the paths in the grounds were built by German POW Officers housed at the Prisoner of War camp in Nash. Ironically the house was also used as a reference point by German bomber crews, aiming their runs at Newport Docks.

Following the death of Garroway Smith in the late 1950s, the house and grounds passed to his niece, Olive Maybury who made various alterations to the house, adding three neo-classical plaster relief panels to the fire surround in the morning room, an ornately carved fire surround in the former kitchen and the replacement of the dilapidated spiral staircase to the top floor of the house, with a Gothic secondary staircase, removed from Plas LLecha at Tredunnock. The family collected exotic animals including Bornean Sun Bears, Himalayan Bears,  lions and a large collection of monkeys, reptiles and exotic birds. The family opened the grounds to the public during the 1960s and 1970s and they were a popular attraction for local families and school children.

In 1980 Whitson Zoo was closed and many of the animals were re-homed. Olive Maybury continued to live at Whitson Court until her death in 1998 at the age of 99. The house and grounds were subsequently sold by the family and was again left empty, listed on Newport Council's "Buildings at Risk" register. It was sold once again in 2008 and has now been fully restored by its current owners under the guidance of Cadw.

Whitehall Farm/Redbrick House
This property is situated in the neighbouring parish of Redwick. The earliest church records show that there has been a house on the site since 1450, then called Whitehall Farm. The main Georgian façade was built in about 1795, by William Phillips, owner of Whiston Court. Phillips built the Brick House in anticipation of his son William's return to Britain from the American Colonies. William junior sadly never returned, however, as the ship bringing him home was wrecked in a storm and William drowned. The house is now a guest house.

Amenities 
The village was the home for the Post Office for the three parishes for many years but this has now long since closed. The village has never been known to have had its own public house. There is a large electricity sub-station, operated by the National Grid, adjacent to the former site of Llanwern steelworks near Whitson Arch. The local newspaper is the South Wales Argus which is published in Newport.

Since March 2015 the village has used a Demand Responsive Transport public bus service (Route 63, two a day, weekdays) provided by Newport Bus.

Upfield Farm Aerodrome
Since 1995 a light aircraft landing strip (council approved for use as a grass strip for the owner, family and friends) was used by Ken Bowen at his Upfield Farm home. By 2008 the strip had become a -long concrete airstrip, a series of aircraft hangars and a perimeter hard standing.

On 4 July 2008 a light aircraft crash-landed after taking off from the airstrip. Narrowly missing both the old Village Hall and a nearby stables, the aircraft burst into flames and was almost completely destroyed. Emergency services attended but both occupants escaped unharmed.

The resultant accident inquiry by Newport City Council and the Civil Aviation Authority found that the airstrip at the farm had grown considerably beyond the scope of its original approved planning permission, and was, according to some local residents, supporting as many as ten flights a day. Bowen applied for retrospective planning permission to retain the facility with its concrete runway, but was denied by the council planning committee on 17 September 2008, acting on advice from the planning department. The owner did not attend the meeting but was given leave to appeal the decision within six months. In November 2009 an appeal was dismissed.

Government 
The area is governed by the Newport City Council and the Goldcliff community council. The village falls within the Llanwern ward of the Newport East parliamentary constituency.

See also
 Putcher fishing

References
This article contains public domain material from J. A. Bradney's History of Monmouthshire (1904).

Notes

External links
 Whitson at genuki.org

Villages in Monmouthshire
Communities in Monmouthshire
Districts of Newport, Wales
Villages in Newport, Wales